Gnosjö is a locality and the seat of Gnosjö Municipality, Jönköping County, Sweden with 4,326 inhabitants in 2010, out of a municipal total of 9,600. In business management, Gnosjö is known for the Gnosjö Spirit.

Notable people 
 Uno Svenningsson
 Maria Larsson
 Stefan Kardebratt, keyboard player in Flamingokvintetten
 Bengt Erlandsson - Founder of  wild West theme park High Chaparral

See also 
Gnosjö region

References 

Populated places in Jönköping County
Municipal seats of Jönköping County
Swedish municipal seats
Finnveden